Laugh? I Nearly Bought One! is the first major compilation album by English post-punk band Killing Joke, released in September 1992 by Caroline Records in the U.S. and in October by Virgin Records in the U.K. and Europe.

Content 
Every studio album up to the time of release is represented, except Fire Dances and Outside the Gate. Three non-album tracks are also included, along with the original Chris Kimsey mix of "Wintergardens" from Brighter than a Thousand Suns, which was previously unreleased at the time.

The album's cover image of a priest blessing Nazi soldiers was previously used by the band for a concert poster in the early 1980s. Because of its theme, it caused quite a stir and the band were banned from playing a concert in Glasgow, Scotland. Contrary to popular belief, the priest in the picture was not Pope Pius XII, but German Nazi abbot Alban Schachleiter.

Reception 

Ned Raggett of AllMusic wrote, "not the best compilation that could have been assembled [...] Laugh? is still a reasonable overview of the first decade of Killing Joke and its checkered but still important history". Trouser Press called the album "commendable", but "a few obscure tracks take the place of more essential choices".

Track listing

Personnel 

 Jaz Coleman – vocals, synthesizer
 Kevin "Geordie" Walker – guitar
 Martin "Youth" Glover – bass guitar on tracks 1 and 3–11
 Paul Raven – bass guitar on tracks 2 and 12–17
 Paul Ferguson – drums, vocals on tracks 1–16
 Martin Atkins – drums, vocals on track 17
 Mike Coles - cover design

References 

1992 compilation albums
Killing Joke albums
Albums produced by Chris Kimsey
Albums produced by Conny Plank